Chi Ming Chan, (born 21 April 1949) is a Chinese chemical engineer at the Hong Kong University of Science and Technology (HKUST).

Education 
Chan obtained his Bachelor of Science in Chemical Engineering (High Distinction) from the University of Minnesota in 1975. He then pursued research and received his Master of Science and Ph.D. degrees in Chemical Engineering from the California Institute of Technology in 1977 and 1979 respectively.

Career 
Chan joined the HKUST in 1993 as a reader and became a professor in 1998. He is currently a chair professor of the Division of Environment and Department of Chemical and Biomolecular Engineering. He is also the director of the Interdisciplinary Programs Office and co-director of the Dual Degree Program in Technology and Management. He served as the associate Dean of the School of Engineering during July 2002 to June 2005 and was the acting department head of the Department of Chemical Engineering during July 2005 to September 2007.

Professional memberships 
Chan is a fellow of the Hong Kong Institution of Engineers, and member of the American Physical Society, American Chemical Society, American Vacuum Society and Society of Plastics Engineers. He is also an honorary chairman of the Society of Plastics Engineers (Hong Kong section).

International awards and honors 
National Science Foundation Undergraduate Scholarship, University of Minnesota, Minneapolis, 1974
Earle C. Anthony Fellowship, California Institute of Technology, 1975 - 1976
American Vacuum Society Scholar, 1977 - 1979
Advisory Professor, South China University of Technology, 1995 -
Visiting Professor, London South Bank University, 2010 - 2015
Top Most Cited 50 Authors (2002 - 2008) in Polymer
Appointed Panel of Assessor for Innovation and Technology Support Programme (ITSP), 2007 - 2009

Selected publications

Books

Papers

References 

Living people
Chinese chemical engineers
University of Minnesota College of Science and Engineering alumni
California Institute of Technology alumni
1949 births
Hong Kong engineers